The Estadi Municipal de Can Misses is a multi-use stadium located in Ibiza, Balearic Islands, Spain. It is currently used for football matches and is the home stadium of UD Ibiza.

History

The stadium was built in 1991 in the neighborhood of Can Misses, and was used only by the main clubs in the city, SD Ibiza and UD Ibiza-Eivissa. In 2003, a roofed grandstand was inaugurated, but had to be replaced in 2012 due to a heavy storm. In 2017, the field was replaced by an artificial grass, and in 2018, the stands were renovated and  waterproofed.

In the decade of 2010s, several clubs in the city shared the stadium, including UD Ibiza and CD Ibiza Islas Pitiusas which were in the national divisions (Segunda División B and Tercera División, respectively). On 4 June 2021, after UD Ibiza achieved promotion to Segunda División, the City Council reached a two-year agreement with the club for the use of the stadium in an exclusive basis, to comply with the Liga de Fútbol Profesional requirements.

References

External links
UD Ibiza profile 
Estadios de España
Soccerway profile

Football venues in the Balearic Islands
UD Ibiza
Sports venues completed in 1991